Valentin Otto (1529 – April 1594) was a Thomaskantor.

Otto studied in Leipzig until 1548. He was Thomaskantor from 1564 to 1594.

1529 births
1594 deaths